We Went to Different Schools Together is the second album by Pittsburgh rock/pop band the Jaggerz, released in 1970. The album includes the group's only successful single, "The Rapper."

Track listing 
 "I Call My Baby Candy" (Ierace)
 "Memoirs of the Traveler" (Rock, Ierace, Faiella)
 "With a Little Help from My Friends" (Lennon, McCartney)
 "Looking Glass" (Rock, Ierace, Faiella)
 "The Rapper" (Ierace)
 "At My Window" (Rock, Ierace)
 "Things Gotta Get Better" (Rock, Davies, Maybray)
 "Carousel" (Rock, Davies, Pugliano)
 "Don't Make My Sky Cry" (Rock, Davies, Maybray)
 "That's My World" (Rock, Davies)

Personnel 
 Dominic Ierace - guitar, bass, trumpet, vocals
 Jimmie Ross - tube, trombone, bass, vocals
 Benny Faiella - guitar, bass, background vocals
 Thom Davies - organ, piano, trumpet
 Billy Maybray - bass, drums, vocals
 Jim Pugliano - drums, background vocals

References 

1970 albums
The Jaggerz albums
Kama Sutra Records albums